This is a list of notable companies based or having major operations in the Denver-Aurora Metropolitan Area.

Headquarters in Denver area
 American Medical Response - emergency services, corporate headquarters in Greenwood Village, Colorado
 Antero Resources - natural gas exploration
 Arrow Electronics - corporate headquarters
 Ball Aerospace & Technologies Corp. - aerospace, corporate headquarters in Broomfield, Colorado
 Bremner Biscuit Company
 CH2M - environmental engineering, corporate headquarters in Englewood, Colorado
 Chipotle Mexican Grill - dining
 Coors Brewing Company - brewing and dining
 Crispin Porter + Bogusky - advertising
 DaVita Inc. - kidney dialysis and other healthcare services
 DigitalGlobe - digital satellite imagery
 DISH Network - pay-TV distributor
 Ebags.com - custom apparel 
 EchoStar  - satellite communication solutions
 Einstein Bros. Bagels - dining
 Frontier Airlines - commercial airline
 Gaiam
 Gates Rubber Company (Gates Corporation) 
 Gray Line Worldwide - transportation
 Ibotta - e-commerce
 The Integer Group - promotional, retail, and shopper marketing
 Janus Capital Group - financial services
 JD Edwards, now part of Oracle Corporation - financial services
 Jones Intercable - television and content distribution
 King Soopers - a division of Kroger - retail consumer goods
 LaMar's Donuts - dining
 Leprino Foods - food manufacturing 
 Level 3 Communications - telecommunications
 Liberty Media - television and content origination and distribution 
 ManiaTV.com
 MediaNews Group - news and media distribution
 Mrs. Fields - Snack food franchise with corporate headquarters in Broomfield, Colorado
 Name.com - Domain name registration and hosting
 National CineMedia - digital content service provider 
 Never Summer - snowboard and skateboard manufacturer
 Newmont Mining - mining and oil exploration 
 Noodles & Company - dining
 oVertone Haircare - hair care 
 Palantir Technologies - software development
 PostNet - Internet postal service provider
 Qdoba Mexican Grill - dining
 Quark, Inc. - software development
 Quizno's - dining
 Red Lion Hotels Corporation
 Red Robin - dining
 RE/MAX - real estate
 Samsonite - specialty luggage manufacturer
 Smashburger - dining
 System76 - computer sales and manufacturing
 TCBY - Frozen yogurt franchise with headquarters in Broomfield, Colorado
 TeleTech - outsourced callcenters
 TransMontaigne - energy and oil refinement and distribution
 Vail Resorts - travel and skiing
VF Corporation - Apparel 
 Western Union - Financial services
 Woody's Chicago Style - dining
 Xanterra Parks & Resorts - tourism and resorts

Branch operations in Denver area
 Brown Brothers Harriman & Co. - investment operations
 CenturyLink - telecommunications
 CH2M Hill - engineering services
 Charles Schwab - financial services
 Charter Communications - television and content distribution 
 Cisco systems - networking and security
 Comcast - television and content distribution
 Conoco - fuel refining
 DaVita Inc. - renal care, corporate headquarters
 DirecTV - television and content origination/distribution
 First Data Corp. - financial services
 GoDaddy.com - domain name registration
 Gymshark - Clothing Manufacturer
 Halliburton - oilfield services
 Hospital Corporation of America, dba HealthONE Colorado - healthcare
 Intuit, Inc. - website products
 K N Energy Inc., part of Kinder Morgan Inc. - engineering services
 Kiewit Western Co., a Kiewit Corporation company - construction
 Kroenke Sports & Entertainment - sports and entertainment
 Lockheed-Martin - space and aerospace technologies
 Medtronic - surgical device manufacturing
 Ovintiv - hydrocarbon exploration
 Owens & Minor - medical device distribution
 PCL Construction - commercial construction 
 Raytheon - defense and aerospace
 Regal Entertainment Group (regional headquarters) - entertainment
 RE/MAX International - real estate
 Rocket Software - U2 software division
 Safeway Inc. - consumer goods (district headquarters)
 The Shaw Group - construction and consulting
 StorageTek -  now part of Oracle Corporation; Internet and software development 
 Sun Microsystems - now part of Oracle Corporation; Internet and software development 
 Suncor Energy - energy and oil refinement and distribution
 Towers Watson - HR consulting
Triangle Pest Control - Denver pest control branch
 United Airlines - commercial airlines
 Vertafore - Insurance Software
 VF Corporation - Clothing Manufacturer
 Visa Inc. - Payment processor
 Washington Group International - part of URS Corporation; engineering, construction and management services
 Western Union  - financial services
 Xcel Energy - electrical energy

Branch restaurants
 Blackjack Pizza - dining
 Boston Market - dining
 Einstein Bros. Bagels - dining
 Red Robin - dining
 Rock Bottom Restaurants - dining
 Village Inn - dining
 Mellow Mushroom - dining

References

Denver metropolitan area
companies